Ohn no khao swè is a Burmese dish consisting of wheat noodles in a curried chicken and coconut milk broth thickened with gram flour (chickpea flour). The dish is often garnished with crisp fried bean fritters, sliced raw onions, chillies, crisp noodles, and slices of hard-boiled egg, and zested with lime or lemon juice and fish sauce.

Due to the popular link between coconut milk and hypertension, a variation which uses evaporated milk instead of coconut milk is also available in certain restaurants. The rest of the ingredients are the same. A dry noodle form of this dish, called shwedaung khao swe (ရွှေတောင်ခေါက်ဆွဲ), consists of egg noodles tossed in a chicken curry cooked in coconut milk gravy.

Ohn no khao swè resembles other coconut milk based noodle soups in Southeast Asia, including the Malaysian laksa, and the khao soi of Chiang Mai and Luang Prabang. The Indian khow suey and Pakistani khausa descend from the Burmese ohn no khao swè, likely coinciding with the mass exodus of Burmese Indians in the 1960s back to South Asia, and remains a popular dish in Eastern India.

See also 
 Khow suey
 Khao soi
 Laksa
 Noodle soup

References

External links

Burmese cuisine
Foods containing coconut
Noodle soups